Rocket artillery is a type of artillery equipped with rocket launchers instead of conventional guns or mortars.

List of rocket artillery systems 
Note that the "Calibre" of rocket projectiles may not refer to the warhead diameter but to the launch tube diameter.

See also
 List of artillery by country

Notes

Rocket